Szentgotthárd is a district in south-western part of Vas County. Szentgotthárd is also the name of the town where the district seat is found. The district is located in the Western Transdanubia Statistical Region.

Geography 
The Szentgotthárd District borders the Austrian state of Burgenland to the north and west, the Körmend District to the east, and Slovenia to the south.

Municipalities 
The district consists of 16 municipalities, 1 town and 15 villages. The seat of the district is highlighted in bold:

Demographics

In 2011, it had a population of 14,961 and the population density was 59/km².

Ethnicity
Besides the Hungarian majority, the main minorities are the Slovene (approx. 1,700), German (650) and Roma (350).

Total population (2011 census): 14,961
Ethnic groups (2011 census): Identified themselves: 15,706 persons:
Hungarians: 12,956 (82.49%)
Slovenes: 1,656 (10.54%)
Germans: 652 (4.15%)
Gypsies: 331 (2.11%)
Others and indefinable: 111 (0.71%)
Approx. 1,000 persons in Szentgotthárd District did declare more than one ethnic group at the 2011 census.

Religion
Religious adherence in the county according to 2011 census:

Catholic – 10,487 (Roman Catholic – 10,474; Greek Catholic – 12);
Reformed – 380;
Evangelical – 202;
Orthodox – 13;
other religions – 77; 
Non-religious – 621; 
Atheism – 87;
Undeclared – 3,094.

See also
List of cities and towns in Hungary

References

External links
 Postal codes of the Szentgotthárd District

Districts in Vas County